I.S.C.V.: Leander is a 1981 role-playing game supplement for Traveller published by FASA.

Contents
I.S.C.V.: Leander is a set of starship deck plans, an interstellar commercial vessel called the Leander.

Publication history
I.S.C.V.: Leander was written by L. Ross Babcock III, and was published in 1981 by FASA as five large map sheets, a scenario sheet, and an outer folder.

Reception
William A. Barton reviewed I.S.C.V.: Leander in The Space Gamer No. 41. Barton commented that "Overall, I'd hesitate to recommend the I.S.C.V.: Leander - or its sister ships - for the price. A referee who has neither the time nor the inclination to design his own ships for miniature actions might find something of use here, provided he doesn't mind the omissions. Anyone else should pass this up and design his own."

Reviews
 Different Worlds #18 (Jan., 1982)

References

Role-playing game supplements introduced in 1981
Traveller (role-playing game) supplements